Christopher Michael Jones is an American actor and dancer better known as Wade from the hit movie You Got Served.

Early life
Christopher began his career as a dancer at the age of 4 and began competing in many dance competitions around the world. At age 10 he was offered roles in the Broadway touring companies of Camelot and The Secret Garden.

Career
After Christopher did Broadway roles he decided to go to Hollywood where he began dancing with big-name artists such as P Diddy and Busta Rhymes on the Soul Train Awards. He also appeared in a Britney Spears Pepsi commercial and her VMA's in 2000. He went on to appear in other musicians videos such as Dream, Shorty 101, and Willa Ford. Then after touring and dancing on other music artist videos he had got his acting debut as Wade the spiky haired antagonist on You Got Served. After his debut big screen success he began doing films such as Big Momma's House 2, Lost in Plainview, and Steppin: The Movie.

Filmography
Forrest Gump (1994)
Tad (1995)
This World, Then the Fireworks (1997)
Holy Joe (1999)
O (2001)
You Got Served (2004)
Lost in Plainview (2005)
Big Momma's House 2 (2006)
Somebody Help Me (2007)
Steppin: The Movie (2009)
Battlefield America (2012) 
No Vacancy (2012)

External links
 http://www.sourcedance.com/faculty/cjonesbio.htm
 https://www.imdb.com/name/nm0427757/
 http://www.gazillionmovies.com/Actor/C/Ch/ChristopherJones.htm
 http://www.codance.com/faculty/chris-jones
 https://www.co.chelan.wa.us/regional-jail/inmate-list?filter=lastname&keyword=Jones

1982 births
Living people
21st-century American male actors
People from Myrtle Beach, South Carolina
Male actors from Los Angeles
American male film actors
Male actors from South Carolina
American male dancers
American male child actors